Centennial Park is a municipal park in Moncton, New Brunswick.

History

Centennial park was originally known as Parkton Nature Park and was changed sometime in the 1950s when it was included in the city of Moncton.

Places of note

The park contains:
 Boating Pond 
 Centennial Dog Park
 Children Splash Park
 Children Playground - Greater Moncton's largest children Playground
 Centennial Rotary Lodge
 Centennial Camp
 Rocky Stone Field
 TreeGo Moncton - Built in 2007, An aerial adventure course
 lighted cross country skiing and hiking trails.
 lawn bowling and tennis facilities

See also

 Moncton Urban Parks
 Mapleton Park
 Irishtown Nature Park
 Victoria Park
 M4 Sherman Tank

References

External links

 Information about the park
 Canuck jet
 Centennial Park profile

Parks in Moncton
Sports venues in Moncton
Buildings and structures in Moncton
Dog parks in Canada
1967 establishments in New Brunswick